Longrun or Long Run may refer to:

 Long-run, a concept in economics
 LongRun, a power management technology

Places 
 Long Run, Indiana
 Long Run, Louisville, Kentucky, United States
 Long Run massacre, a massacre during the American Revolutionary War
 Longrun, Missouri, United States
 Long Run, Ohio, a ghost town
 Long Run, West Virginia
 Long Run (Cranberry Creek), a tributary of Cranberry Creek in Pennsylvania
 Long Run (Elk Run), a tributary of Elk Run in Sullivan County, Pennsylvania
 Long Run (Nescopeck Creek), a tributary of Nescopeck Creek in Luzerne County

Other uses 
 Long Run (horse), a National Hunt racehorse

See also
 Short-run
 The Long Run (disambiguation)
 Long March (disambiguation)
 Long Play (disambiguation)
 Long Walk (disambiguation)